Beijerinck is a lunar impact crater on the far side of the Moon. It lies to the south of the larger crater Chaplygin, and to the northeast of the huge walled plain Gagarin.

The outer rim of this crater is heavily worn and eroded by subsequent meteor bombardment, particularly along the southern half, with several small and tiny craterlets lying along the rim. The interior floor, in contrast, is relatively level and unmarked by notable impacts. There is a small, angled central peak near the midpoint of the floor.

Satellite craters
By convention these features are identified on lunar maps by placing the letter on the side of the crater midpoint that is closest to Beijerinck.

References

 
 
 
 
 
 
 
 
 
 
 
 

Impact craters on the Moon
Martinus Beijerinck